Andrew Barron may refer to:

 Andrew Barron (cricketer) (1881–1915), New Zealand cricketer
 Andrew Barron (footballer) (born 1980), New Zealand association football player
 Andrew Barron (speed skater) (born 1951), Canadian ice speed skater
 Andrew R. Barron (born 1962), British chemist, academic, and entrepreneur
 Andy Barron (born 1983), American photographer